CGB may refer to:
 covertgoBlue, a popular youtube content creator
 Chorionic gonadotropin beta, a protein encoded by the CGB gene
 Christian Trade Union Federation of Germany
 Compagnie des Chemins de Fer de Grande Banlieue, a defunct railway in France
 Consumer & Governmental Affairs Bureau, a part of the Federal Communications Commission
 Game Boy Color (product code CGB-001), Nintendo
 Marechal Rondon International Airport (IATA code), in Cuiabá, Brazil
 Station code for Cigombong railway station